The 1958 Round Australia Trial, officially the Ampol Trial was the eighth running of the Round Australia Trial. The rally took place between 18 May and 1 June 1958. The event covered 12,070 kilometres around Australia. It was won by Don Garard and Jim Roberts, driving a Holden FE.

Results

References

Rally competitions in Australia
Round Australia Trial